The southern pigtoe (Pleurobema georgianum) is a species of freshwater mussel, an aquatic bivalve mollusk in the family Unionidae, the river mussels.

This species is endemic to the United States.

References

Endemic fauna of the United States
Critically endangered fauna of the United States
Pleurobema
Bivalves described in 1841
ESA endangered species
Taxonomy articles created by Polbot